Elizabeth Morgan may refer to:

Elizabeth Morgan (actress), British film, television, and onstage actress
Elizabeth Morgan (politician) (1904–1981), Welsh Liberal Party politician
Elizabeth Morgan (surgeon), beneficiary of the Elizabeth Morgan Act
Elizabeth Morgan, Marchioness of Anglesey (1924–2017), British writer
Elizabeth Chambers Morgan (1850–1944), socialist labor activist

See also
Beth Morgan (disambiguation)
Betty Morgan (disambiguation)
Betsy Morgan (disambiguation)